Joe Maddock may refer to:

Joe Maddock (coach) (1877–1943), college football player and coach
Joe Maddock (rugby union) (born 1978), New Zealand rugby union player